Neil Nicholson may refer to:

Neil Nicholson (cricketer), English cricketer
Neil Nicholson (ice hockey), Canadian ice hockey player
Neil Nicholson (swimmer), British swimmer